The third American Basketball Association All-Star Game was played on January 24, 1970, at Indiana State Fair Coliseum in Indianapolis, Indiana before an audience at 11,932. Bobby Leonard of the Indiana Pacers coached the East, with Babe McCarthy of the New Orleans Buccaneers coached the West.

Results 
Rookie Spencer Haywood of the Denver Rockets was named MVP of the game after a 23-point, 19 point, and 7-blocked shot performance.  Haywood would go on the be named ABA Rookie of the Year and ABA MVP for the regular season that same year.

Western Conference

Eastern Conference
 
 
Halftime — West, 61-41
Third Quarter — West, 86-74
Officials: Earl Strom and John Vanak
Attendance: 11,932.

References

External links 
 ABA All Star Game at RemembertheABA.com

All-Star
ABA All-star game
ABA All-star game